The Fujifilm Finepix S1500 is a discontinued 2009 digital camera manufactured by Fujifilm as part of their Finepix range. It is a superzoom compact camera, resembling a small Digital SLR camera.

Specification
Below are the technical specifications of the Finepix S1500.

External links
 Photography Blog review of S1500
 Fujifilm UK official page (archived)

References

S1500
Cameras introduced in 2009
Bridge digital cameras